A statue of Christopher Columbus stands in the Bayfront Park of Miami, Florida, United States.

History 
The statue itself was sculpted by Count Vittorio di Colbertaldo (1902-1979) of Verona, one of Benito Mussolini's hand picked ceremonial bodyguards known as the "Black Musketeers." Colbertaldo doubled as the Musketeers's sculptor, producing statues which commemorated the organization.  A second Columbus statue done by Colbertaldo was in San Francisco until its removal in 2020.

The statue was vandalized in June 2020 during the George Floyd protests.

See also
 Statue of Christopher Columbus (San Francisco)
 List of monuments and memorials to Christopher Columbus

References

Buildings and structures in Miami
Monuments and memorials in Florida
Outdoor sculptures in Florida
Sculptures of men in the United States
Statues in Florida
Miami
Vandalized works of art in Florida